Micrometer can mean:

 Micrometer (device), used for accurate measurements by means of a calibrated screw
 American spelling of micrometre, a millionth of a metre